Anton Yervandi Kochinyan (25 October 1913 – 1 December 1990, Yerevan) was a Soviet Armenian politician. He was Chairman of the Council of Ministers from 1952 to 1966, and the First Secretary of the Communist Party of Armenia from 1966 until his retirement in 1974.

Biography 
He pleaded unsuccessfully with central government in Moscow for the unification of Karabakh with Armenia. He was succeeded by Karen Demirchyan in 1974.

Publications 
 Anton Kochinyan (1960) Armenia: big strides in an ancient land. London, Soviet Booklets

References
Кочинян Антон Ервандович. knowbysight.info

1913 births
1990 deaths
People from Lori Province
People from Erivan Governorate
Central Committee of the Communist Party of the Soviet Union members
Members of the Supreme Soviet of the Soviet Union
Heads of government of the Armenian Soviet Socialist Republic
First Secretaries of the Armenian Communist Party
Recipients of the Order of Lenin
Foreign ministers of Armenia